This is a list of members of the Parliament of Tuvalu or Palamene o Tuvalu as elected at the 2006 Tuvaluan general election:

Apisai Ielemia was appointed to be the Prime Minister of Tuvalu.

References

Tuvalu politics-related lists